Jozef Bakos (1891–1977) was an American painter best known for his Western landscapes.

Bakos was one of Los Cinco Pintores, who worked in Santa Fe, New Mexico. Bakos studied art with John E. Thompson at the Albright Art Institute in Buffalo, New York. He later followed Thompson to Colorado and taught at the University of Colorado, Boulder.

In 1920, while the University of Colorado was closed due to an influenza epidemic, Bakos visited Walter Mruk, a childhood friend and artist who was living in Santa Fe. During his stay he exhibited some paintings together with Mruk at the Museum of Fine Arts. Following his relocation to New Mexico, Bakos worked for the U.S. Forest Service stationed at what is now Bandelier National Monument. The next year Bakos formed an artists' group called "Los Cinco Pintores" (the five painters) with Mruk, Fremont Ellis, Willard Nash, and Will Shuster. Los Cinco Pintores was Santa Fe's first Modernist art group and produced works that depicted specifically American subjects such as the New Mexico landscape, local adobe architecture and Native American ceremonial dances. Bakos was also an accomplished carver and made copies of Spanish Colonial furniture and doors. In 1923 Bakos married another artist, Teresa Bakos, and they spent a good portion of their lives together.

Denver Art Museum, Phoenix Art Museum, Brooklyn Museum of Art, the Whitney Museum of American Art, the Stark Museum of Art and the New Mexico Museum of Art hold works made by Bakos in their art collections.

His home in Santa Fe, at 576 Camino del Monte Sol, is listed on the National Register of Historic Places as a contributing building in the Camino del Monte Sol Historic District.

References

1891 births
1977 deaths
20th-century American painters
American male painters
American landscape painters
American people of Polish descent
Artists from Santa Fe, New Mexico
University of Colorado Boulder faculty
Artists from Buffalo, New York
Federal Art Project artists
20th-century American male artists